Alonso is a Spanish name of Germanic origin that is a Castilian variant of Adalfuns.

Geographical distribution
As of 2014, 36.6% of all known bearers of the surname Alonso were residents of Spain (frequency 1:222), 26.1% of Mexico (1:832), 8.3% of Cuba (1:242), 7.0% of Argentina (1:1,061), 4.8% of Brazil (1:7,502), 4.5% of the United States (1:14,083), 2.5% of Colombia (1:3,318), 1.7% of Paraguay (1:736), 1.3% of France (1:9,082) and 1.1% of Uruguay (1:549).

In Spain, the frequency of the surname was higher than average (1:222) in the following regions:
 1. Asturias (1:69)
 2. Castile and León (1:73)
 3. Cantabria (1:96)
 4. Galicia (1:125)
 5. Basque Country (1:145)
 6. La Rioja (1:149)
 7. Canary Islands (1:159)
 8. Community of Madrid (1:171)

First name 
 Alonso del Castillo Maldonado, Spanish explorer of the 16th century
 Alonso Fernández Álvarez (born 1982), Costa Rican male model
 Alonso López (disambiguation), several people 
 Alonso Fernández de Lugo (1450s–1525), Spanish conquistador
 Alonso Manrique de Lara (1476–1538), Spanish cardinal
 Alonso Ferreira de Matos (born 1980), Brazilian footballer
 Alonso Mudarra (1510–1580), Spanish composer and vihuelist
 Alonso Pérez ( 1881–1914), Spanish painter
 Alonso Álvarez de Pineda (1494–1520), Spanish explorer and cartographer
 Martín Alonso Pinzón (1441–1493), Spanish navigator
 Alonso Solís (born 1978), Costa Rican footballer
 Alonso de Solís, Spanish explorer and governor of Florida in 1576
 Alonso de Ercilla y Zúñiga (1533–1594), Spanish soldier and poet
 Alonzo Wilcox (1810–1878), American politician
 Alonso Quixano, the fictitious hero of Don Quixote
 Alonso, King of Naples, fictitious character in Shakespeare's The Tempest

Surname 
 Alejandro Alonso (musician) (1952–2022), Latin-American musician
 Alejandro Alonso (footballer) (born 1982), Argentinian football player
 Alfredo Alonso, Cuban media executive
 Alicia Alonso (1920–2019), Cuban ballerina and choreographer
 América Alonso (1936–2022), Venezuelan actress
 Antonella Alonso (born 1990), Venezuelan pornographic actress
 Armando Alonso (born 1984), Costa Rican footballer
 Axel Alonso, American comic book creator best known as the former Editor-in-Chief at Marvel Comics
 Braulio Alonso (1916–2010), American educator
 Carlos Alonso (born 1971), Canadian Musician
 Clara Alonso (model) (born 1987), Spanish model
 Constanza Alonso (born 1986), Argentine politician
 Dámaso Alonso (1898–1990), Spanish poet, philologist and literary critic
 Daniella Alonso (born 1978), American actress
 Diego Alonso (born 1975), Uruguayan footballer
 Edu Alonso (born 1974), Spanish footballer
 Ernesto Alonso (1917–2007), Mexican film director and producer
 Fernando Alonso (born 1981), Spanish racing driver
 Fernando Alonso (dancer) (1914–2013), Cuban ballet dancer
 Francisco Alonso (1887–1948), Spanish composer
 Iván Alonso (born 1979), Uruguayan footballer
 Jessica Alonso Bernardo (born 1983), Spanish handball player
 José Alonso (athlete) (born 1957), Spanish athlete
 José Alonso (actor) (born 1947), Mexican actor
 José Alonso (trade unionist) (1917–1970), Argentine trade-unionist
 José María Alonso (1890–1979), Spanish tennis player
 José Antonio Alonso (1960–2017), Spanish Socialist Workers' Party (PSOE) politician
 José Ángel Alonso (born 1989), Spanish footballer
 Juan Alonso (footballer, born 1927) (1927–1994), Spanish footballer
 Julián Alonso (born 1977), Spanish tennis player
 Júnior Alonso (born 1993), Paraguayan football player
 Kiko Alonso (born 1990), American football linebacker
 Laura Alonso (soprano), Spanish operatic soprano
 Laura Alonso (politician), Argentine politician
 Laz Alonso (born 1974), American actor
 Lisandro Alonso (born 1975), Argentine filmmaker
 Luís Alonso Pérez (1922–1972), also known as Lula, Brazilian football manager
 Manuel A. Alonso (1822–1889), Puerto Rican writer
 Marcos Alonso Imaz (1933–2012), Spanish footballer
 Marcos Alonso Peña (1959–2023), Spanish footballer
 Marcos Alonso Mendoza (born 1990), Spanish footballer
 María Conchita Alonso (born 1957), Cuban singer and actress
 María Rosa Alonso (1909–2011), Spanish professor, philologist, essayist
 Miguel Ángel Alonso, Spanish former football midfielder and manager
 Mikel Alonso (born 1980), Spanish footballer
 Mónica Alonso (born 1998), Spanish rhythmic gymnast 
 Noel Alonso (born 1987), Spanish footballer
 Norberto Alonso (born 1953), Argentine footballer
 Osvaldo Alonso (born 1985), Cuban footballer
 Pete Alonso (born 1994), American baseball player
 Pichi Alonso (born 1954), Spanish footballer
 Rafael Salazar Alonso (1895–1936), Spanish politician, lawyer, and newspaper mogul, served as mayor of Madrid
 Tomás N. Alonso (1881–1962), Filipino writer
 William Alonso (1933–1999), Argentinian-American economist
 Xabi Alonso (born 1981), Spanish footballer
 Yonder Alonso (born 1987), Cuban baseball player

See also 
 
 Alonzo, a given name and surname
 Alfonso, a male given name

References 

Spanish masculine given names
Spanish-language surnames
Surnames of Spanish origin